Radio Tele Ginen is a politics, sports, and music Haitian radio and television station based in Port-au-Prince.

See also
 Media of Haiti

External links
 Listen Online on ZenoLive

Radio stations in Haiti